Jean-Victor Schnetz (April 14, 1787 in Versailles – March 15, 1870 in Paris) was a French academic painter well regarded for his historical and genre paintings.

Biography 
Schnetz studied in Paris under Jacques-Louis David.  His works can be found at the Louvre Museum and the Petit Palais in Paris, the Château de Versailles in Versailles, the Hermitage in St. Petersburg, and the Museum of Fine Arts in San Francisco.  

In 1837 Schnetz was elected to the Académie des Beaux-Arts, and he was twice the Director of the French Academy in Rome, from 1841 to 1846 then again in 1853-1866.  Schnetz was made a Chevalier of the Legion of Honor in 1825, and raised to Commander in 1866.

See also
Combat devant l'Hôtel de Ville le 28 juillet 1830

References

External link 

1787 births
1870 deaths
People from Versailles
19th-century French painters
Burials at Père Lachaise Cemetery
Commandeurs of the Légion d'honneur
French male painters
Members of the Académie des beaux-arts
Pupils of Jacques-Louis David